P. nobilis may refer to:
 Peltodoris nobilis, the sea lemon or noble dorid, a colorful sea slug species
 Petaurista nobilis, the Bhutan giant flying squirrel, a rodent species found in Bangladesh, Bhutan, China, India and Nepal
 Pinna nobilis, the noble pen shell, a bivalve mollusk species
 Pitcairnia nobilis, a plant species native to Ecuador
 Polymixia nobilis, the stout beardfish, a fish species

Synonyms
 Pilumna nobilis, a synonym for Trichopilia fragrans, an orchid species found from Caribbean to southern tropical America

See also
 Nobilis (disambiguation)